Elana Cunningham Wills (born c. 1962) is an Arkansas Supreme Court justice. Appointed in September 2008, she will serve on the Court until the end of December 2010. She was previously the state's Deputy Attorney General for Opinions.

Early life 
Wills was raised in Jonesboro, Arkansas.

Education 
Wills earned a bachelor's degree in business from Arkansas State University and a law degree from the University of Arkansas School of Law.

Career 
Wills has been in the Opinions Division of the Arkansas Attorney General's Office since 1988. Most recently, she had been the state's Deputy Attorney General for Opinions.

On September 2, 2008, she was appointed by Arkansas Governor Mike Beebe to fill a judgeship on the Arkansas Supreme Court following the retirement of Justice Tom Glaze. She was sworn into the office on October 1, 2008 and the term will expire on December 31, 2010. Among other cases she will address is what is probably the final proceeding in the Arkansas State Court system for the West Memphis Three.

Personal life 
Wills married Jay Wills, an attorney, in the early 1990s. They have one daughter, Grace.

Awards
Freedom of Information Award, Arkansas Press Association

References

External links
Arkansas Supreme Court

1960s births
Living people
American women judges
Arkansas lawyers
Arkansas State University alumni
Justices of the Arkansas Supreme Court
People from Jonesboro, Arkansas
University of Arkansas alumni
Year of birth uncertain
21st-century American women
21st-century American women judges
21st-century American judges